Jewish population centers have shifted tremendously over time, due to the constant streams of Jewish refugees created by expulsions, persecution, and officially sanctioned killing of Jews in various places at various times. In addition, assimilation and forced conversions have also impacted Jewish population sizes throughout Jewish history.

The 20th century saw a large shift in Jewish populations, as a result of large-scale migration to the Americas and Palestine due to pogroms in the Russian Empire followed by the Holocaust. The independence of Israel sparked mass emigrations and expulsions of Jews from the Arab world.

Today, the majority of the world's Jewish population is concentrated in Israel and the United States.

Ancient and medieval times

The Torah contains a number of statements as to the number of (adult, male) Hebrews that left Egypt, the descendants of the seventy sons and grandsons of Jacob who took up their residence in that country. Altogether, including Levites, the number given is 611,730. For non-Levites, this represents men fit for military service, i.e. between twenty and sixty years of age; among the Levites the relevant number is those obligated in temple service (males between twenty and fifty years of age). This would imply a population of about 3,000,000. The Census of David is said to have recorded 1,300,000 males over twenty years of age, which would imply a population of over 5,000,000. The number of exiles who returned from Babylon is given at 42,360. Tacitus declares that Jerusalem at its fall contained 600,000 persons; Josephus, that there were as many as 1,100,000 slain in the destruction of Jerusalem in CE 70, along with 97,000 who were sold as slaves. However, Josephus also qualifies this count, noting that Jerusalem was besieged during the Passover. The majority of the 1,197,000 would not have been residents of the city, but rather were visiting for the festival. These appear (writes Jacobs) to be all the figures accessible for ancient times, and their trustworthiness is a matter of dispute. 1,100,000 is comparable to the population of the largest cities that existed anywhere in the world before the 19th century, but geographically the Old City of Jerusalem is just a few per cent the size of such cities as ancient Rome, Constantinople, Edo period Tokyo and Han Dynasty Xi'an. The difficulties of commissariat in the Sinai desert for such a number as 3,000,000 have been pointed out by John William Colenso.

In the Bar Kokhba revolt of 132–135 CE, 580,000 Jews were slain, according to Cassius Dio (lxix. 14). According to Theodor Mommsen, in the first century C.E. there were no fewer than 1,000,000 Jews in Egypt, in a total of 8,000,000 inhabitants; of these 200,000 lived in Alexandria, whose total population was 500,000. Adolf Harnack (Ausbreitung des Christentums, Leipzig, 1902) reckons that there were 1,000,000 Jews in Syria (which included Lebanon) and the areas east of the Euphrates at the time of Nero in 60's CE, and 700,000 in Judea, and he allows for an additional 1,500,000 in other places, thus estimating that there were in the first century 4,200,000 Jews in the world. Jacobs remarks that this estimate is probably excessive.

As regards the number of Jews in the Middle Ages, Benjamin of Tudela, about 1170, enumerates altogether 1,049,565; but of these 100,000 are attributed to Persia and India, 100,000 to Arabia, and 300,000 to an undecipherable "Thanaim", which were likely mere guesses with regard to the Eastern Jews, with whom he did not personally encounter. There were at that time probably not many more than 500,000 in the countries he visited, and probably not more than 750,000 altogether. The only real data for the Middle Ages are with regard to special Jewish communities.

The Middle Ages were mainly a period of expulsions. In 1290, 16,000 Jews were expelled from England; in 1306, 100,000 from France; and in 1492, about 200,000 from Spain. Smaller but more frequent expulsions occurred in Germany, so that at the commencement of the 16th century only four great Jewish communities remained: Frankfurt, 2,000; Worms, 1,400; Prague, 10,000; and Vienna, 3,000 (Heinrich Grätz, Geschichte der Juden x. 29). Joseph Jacobs estimated that during the five centuries from 1000 to 1500, 380,000 Jews were killed during the persecutions, reducing the total number in the world to about 1,000,000. In the 16th and 17th centuries the main centers of Jewish population were in Poland and the Mediterranean countries, Spain excepted.

By the early 13th century, the world Jewish population had fallen to 2 million from a peak at 8 million during the 1st century, and possibly half this number, with only 250,000 of the 2 million living in Christian lands. Many factors had devastated the Jewish population, including the Bar Kokhba revolt and the First Crusade. The 13th-century author Bar Hebraeus gave a figure of 6,944,000 Jews in the Roman world. Salo Wittmayer Baron considered the figure convincing. The figure of seven million within and one million outside the Roman world in the mid-first century became widely accepted, including by Louis Feldman. However, contemporary scholars now accept that Bar Hebraeus based his figure on a census of total Roman citizens and thus, included non-Jews.   John R. Bartlett rejects Baron's figures entirely, arguing that we have no clue as to the size of the Jewish demographic in the ancient world.

Cecil Roth estimated that by the year 1500, the number of the Historic Ashkenazim in Germany, France and Austria was about 150,000 combined; the majority of them were expelled to Poland and Lithuania where a few dozen thousand Jews already resided. Roth estimated the number of the Jews who predated the Ashkenazim in Eastern Europe to be at about 230,000 who lost their identities as Knaanim and Romaniotes in favor of the Ashkenazi liturgy. Based upon the estimation of Roth, Edgar Polomé and Werner Winter had questioned the number of the Eastern European Jews even further and estimated that prior to the arrival of the Ashkenazim, these Eastern Jews were at about 300,000. 
However, according to more recent research, mass migrations of Ashkenazim occurred to Eastern Europe, from Central Europe in the west, who due to high birth rates absorbed and largely replaced the preceding non-Ashkenazi Jewish groups of Eastern Europe (whose numbers the demographer Sergio Della Pergola considers to have been small). Genetic evidence also indicates that Yiddish-speaking Eastern European Jews largely descend from Ashkenazi Jews who migrated from west and central Europe to eastern Europe around the late Middle Ages and subsequently experienced high birthrates and genetic isolation.

It is estimated by some modern geneticists from Israel that modern Ashkenazi Jews descend from about 25,000 individuals who lived in 1300 A.D.  A more recent study by Shai Carmi et al. indicated an even smaller population, where modern Ashkenazi Jews commonly descend from only approximately 350 individuals who lived around 1350 A.D., and who were of an even mix of Middle Eastern and European ancestry.

Modern era

Dutch researcher Adriaan Reland in 1714 published an account of his visit to Ottoman Palestine. In his informal census he relates the existence of significant Jewish populations throughout the country, particularly in Jerusalem, Tiberias, Safed and Gaza. Hebron also had a significant Jewish community. Together these communities formed what would be called the Old Yishuv.

Again following Jacobs, Jacques Basnage at the beginning of the 18th century estimated the total number of European Jews at 1,360,000, but according to a census at the First Partition of Poland in 1772, the Jews of the Polish–Lithuanian Commonwealth numbered 308,500. As these formed the larger part of the European Jews, it is doubtful whether the total number was more than 400,000 at the middle of the 18th century; and, counting those in the lands of Islam, the entire number in the world at that time could not have been much more than 1,000,000.

Assuming that those numbers are reasonable, the increase in the next few centuries was remarkably rapid. It was checked in Germany by the laws limiting the number of Jews in special towns, and perhaps still more by overcrowding; Jacobs gives citations for there being 7,951 Jews at Prague in 1786 and 5,646 in 1843, and 2,214 at Frankfurt in 1811.

Chubinsky  reports that in 1840 the Jews of southern Russia were accustomed to dwell thirteen in a house, whereas among the general population the average was only four to five (Globus, 1880, p. 340). The rapid increase was undoubtedly due to the early age of marriage and the small number of deaths of infants in the stable communities. The chief details known for any length of time are for the Netherlands, Hungary, Poland, and Württemberg; see chart at right.

Jacobs in the Jewish Encyclopedia presents some evidence that Jewish increase in this period may have exceeded that of the general population, but remarks also that such figures of increase are often very deceptive, as they may indicate not the natural increase by surplus of births over deaths, but accession by immigration. This applies especially to Germany during the early part of the 19th century, when Jews from Galicia and Poland seized every opportunity of moving westward. Arthur Ruppin, writing in the late 19th century, when forcible measures were taken to prevent Russian Jews from settling in Germany, showed that the growth of the Jewish population in Germany had almost entirely ceased, owing to a falling birth rate and, possibly, to emigration. Similarly, during this period, England and the United States showed notable Jewish immigration.

This growth in actual numbers was somewhat offset by conversion away from Judaism. While Halakha (Jewish law) says that a Jew who converts is still a Jew, in the climate of persecution that prevailed in much of Europe in this period, conversion tended to be accompanied by a repudiation of Jewish identity, and converts to Christianity generally ceased to be considered part of the Jewish community. The Jewish Encyclopedia gives some statistics on conversion of Jews to Protestantism, Roman Catholicism, Greek Catholicism and Orthodox Christianity. The upshot is that some 2,000 European Jews converted to Christianity every year during the 19th century, but that in the 1890s the number was running closer to 3,000 per year, — 1,000 in Austria-Hungary, 1,000 in Russia, 500 in Germany, and the remainder in the Anglo-Saxon world. Partly balancing this were about 500 converts to Judaism each year, mainly formerly Christian women who married Jewish men. For Russia, Galicia, and Romania, conversions were dwarfed by emigration: in the last quarter of the 19th century, probably 1,000,000 Jews from this area of Europe emigrated, primarily to the United States, but many also to the United Kingdom.

Toward the end of the 19th century, estimates of the number of Jews in the world ranged from about 6,200,000 (Encyclopædia Britannica, 1881) to 10,932,777 (American Jewish Year Book, 1904–1905). This can be compared with estimates of about half that number a mere 60 years earlier, though for comparison estimates of the total population of Europe show it also to have doubled between 1800 and 1900.

The Jewish Encyclopedia article on which this discussion is largely based estimates only 314,000 Sephardic Jews at the end of the 19th century. More recent scholarship tends to suggest that this estimate is low. The same source gives two wildly different estimate for the Falasha, the Ethiopian Jews, variously estimating them at 50,000 and 200,000; the former would be comparable to their present-day population.

In 1939, the core Jewish population reached its historical peak of 17 million (0.8% of the global population). Because of the Holocaust, the number had been reduced to 11 million by the end of 1945. The population grew again to around 13 million by the 1970s, but has since recorded near-zero growth until around 2005 due to low fertility rates and to assimilation. Since 2005, the world's Jewish population has been growing modestly at a rate of around 0.78% (in 2013). This increase primarily reflects the rapid growth of Haredi and some Orthodox sectors, who are becoming a growing proportion of Jews.

According to a 2017 Pew Research Center survey, between 2010 and 2015 "an estimated one million babies were born to Jewish mothers and roughly 600,000 Jewish died, meaning that the natural increase in the Jewish populationi.e., the number of births minus the number of deathswas 500,000 over this period". according to same study, over the next four decades the number of Jews around the world is expected to increase from 14.2 million in 2015 to 16.3 million in 2060.

Comparisons

a. Albania, Iraq, Jordan, Lebanon, Macedonia, Syria, Turkey
b. Baltic states (Estonia, Latvia, Lithuania), Belarus, Moldova, Russia (including Siberia), Ukraine.
c. Caucasus (Armenia, Azerbaijan, Georgia), Central Asia (Kazakhstan, Kyrgyzstan, Tajikistan, Turkmenistan, Uzbekistan).

See also

 Aliyah
 Estimates of historical world population
 Expulsions and exoduses of Jews
 Genetic studies on Jews
 Historical Jewish population by country
 Jewish diaspora
 Jewish ethnic divisions
 Jewish history
 Yerida

References

External links

 Jewish Population in the World and Israel at the Israel Central Bureau of Statistics

Jewish
Population
 
Jewish
Aftermath of the Holocaust